L2F, or Layer 2 Forwarding, is a tunneling protocol developed by Cisco Systems, Inc. to establish virtual private network connections over the Internet.  L2F does not provide encryption or confidentiality by itself; It relies on the protocol being tunneled to provide privacy.  L2F was specifically designed to tunnel Point-to-Point Protocol (PPP) traffic.

Use
Virtual dial-up allows many separate and autonomous protocol domains to share common access infrastructure including modems, Access Servers, and ISDN routers. RFCs prior to 2341 have specified protocols for supporting IP dial-up via SLIP and multiprotocol dial-up via PPP.

L2F packet structure

Other VPN protocols
IPsec
L2TP Layer 2 Tunneling Protocol
OpenVPN
PPTP Point-to-Point Tunneling Protocol

References

External links
 L2F on Cisco.com
 VPDN on Cisco.com
 L2TP on Cisco.com
 RFC2341 on IETF.org
 RFC2341 on RFC Archive

Cisco protocols